Miguel de Achaval (born May 8, 1982 in Buenos Aires) is an Argentine rugby union footballer. He plays in the back row. In May 2010 he was selected in a squad of over 40 players to represent Argentina in the two test Summer tour of Argentina.

References

scrum.com
rugbytime.com

External links
scrum.com
rugbytime.com

Living people
Argentine rugby union players
Argentina international rugby union players
Rugby union number eights
Sportspeople from Rosario, Santa Fe
1982 births